Society and Mental Health is a triannual peer-reviewed academic journal published by SAGE for  the American Sociological Association Section on the Sociology of Mental Health. It publishes "original articles that apply sociological concepts and methods to the understanding of the social origins of mental health and illness, the social consequences for persons with mental illness, and the organization and financing of mental health services and care. Society and Mental Health publishes articles that advance the sociology of mental health and illness, stimulate further research, inform treatments and policy and reflect the diversity of interests of its readership."
The current editors-in-chief are Timothy J. Owens and Susan Roxburgh (Kent State University). The past editors are  Elaine Wethington (Cornell University) and William Avison (Western University, Canada).

References

External links 

 

Publications established in 2011
Sociology journals
English-language journals
Public health journals
SAGE Publishing academic journals